Piso 21 is a Colombian Latin pop group.  Their singles "Me Llamas", "Besándote" and "Déjala Que Vuelva" were hits in their home country, Latin America and Spain.

Career
Piso 21 is a Colombian group composed of Pablo Mejía (Pablito), Juan David Huertas (El Profe), David Escobar (Dim) and David Lorduy Hernández (Lorduy), with Colombian artist Juan David Castaño (El Llane) being one of its founding members. The name Piso 21 derives from an elevator in a building in Medellin, Colombia, the building had 21 floors.

The group formed in 2007, but it was not until 2012 that the group started receiving widespread recognition. With songs like: "Vagones Vacíos", "Ángel Mortal" and "Correr El Riesgo", the group's fame in Colombia steadily grew.  Later in 2012, thanks to the success of their debut studio album Piso 21. The group was nominated for Best New Artist in the Latin Grammy Awards that same year.

In 2014, Piso 21 released the single "Suele Suceder" featuring Puerto Rican singer Nicky Jam. The song was a commercial success in Latin America and reached the top 20 in the Colombian Monitor Latino charts. The song also became the group's first charting single in the US charts built for Latin audiences by Billboard, where it peaked at number 29 on the Tropical Songs chart. The following year in 2015, the group released the singles: "Quítate La Pena", "Delicia" and "Hoy" featuring Chilean singer Florencia Arenas.

In 2016, Piso 21 signed with Warner Music Latina, and later on in the year, released the single "Me Llamas", which ended up reaching the top 40 in several countries throughout Latin America and became their most successful single to date at the time. On 2 December 2016, an official remix featuring Colombian singer Maluma was released. The remix helped further add to the song's momentum.

In 2016, they became one of the most popular group in Mexico, having 4 concerts fully sold out. While they love singing and playing in Mexico they also enjoy spending time walking around the city and getting to know beautiful places around it. An advantage that they have in Mexico and that they've always said is that they have their clothing designers who make their outfits for their concerts, they love talking about "Rafael & Isaac".

In early 2017, they released the single "Besándote" which like their previous single, ended up becoming a widespread commercial success, reaching the top 40 in several countries in Latin America. On 1 September 2017, the group released an official remix featuring British singer Anne-Marie to celebrate their YouTube channel surpassing over a million subscribers. On 19 October 2017, they released the single "Déjala Que Vuelva" featuring Manuel Turizo. The song became an instant success across Latin America, where it topped multiple Spotify charts in the region and became certified Gold in Colombia just merely two weeks after its release. On 10 November 2017, they released the single "Tu Héroe". Which later ended up peaking at number seven on the Paraguayan Monitor Latino charts. The song was then followed by the single "Adrenalina" on 1 December 2017, which featured Spanish rapper Maikel Delacalle.

In early 2018, Piso 21 collaborated with Argentinian singer Paulo Londra on the single "Te Amo", which was released on 15 March 2018. On 11 May 2018 the group released the single "La Vida Sin Ti" to coincide with the release of their second studio album Ubuntu. Later in the year, on 14 September 2018, they released the song "Punto Suspensivos", as the eighth single from their second studio album Ubuntu. The group then released the single "Te Vi" with Venezuelan singer Micro TDH on 14 December 2018.

In early 2019, on the 3 February, one of the founding members of the group Juan David Castaño (El Llane), announced his departure from the group to pursue a career as a solo artist. He was subsequently replaced by the up-and-coming Colombian artist David Lorduy Hernández (Lorduy).

On October 13th of 2022, Piso 21 released their fifth album "777". Although relatively new, this album is just as popular as their others.

The group has toured extensively in South America and overseas.

Discography

Albums

Studio albums

Compilation albums

Singles

As lead artist

As featured artist

Notes

References

External links
  
 

Latin pop music groups
Colombian pop music groups
Colombian reggaeton musicians
Year of birth missing (living people)
Warner Music Latina artists